

Lake Baldegg is a lake in the Canton of Lucerne, Switzerland. Its area is about 5.2 km2 and its maximum depth is 69 m.

See also
List of lakes of Switzerland

References

External links

Waterlevels of Lake Baldegg at Gelfingen

Lakes of Switzerland
Lakes of the canton of Lucerne
LBaldegg